The North American Table Tennis Championships is a table tennis tournament for North America. It was first held in 1985 in Lake Placid. After this edition the North American Championships were suspended till 1991. Since 1991, the tournament was held every year.

Results

See also
 Table tennis
 World Table Tennis Championships
 List of table tennis players

References

External links
 ITTF Statistics

Table tennis competitions
Table tennis in North America